Jack Gentry (born 5 July 1907, date of death unknown) was a South African cricketer. He played in six first-class matches in 1926/27 and 1927/28.

References

External links
 

1907 births
Year of death missing
South African cricketers
Eastern Province cricketers
Western Province cricketers
People from Potchefstroom